Hibbertia circinata is a species of flowering plant in the family Dilleniales and is endemic to eastern Australia. It is a tall, upright shrub with yellow flowers and broad, dark green leaves. It is a critically endangered species endemic to New South Wales.

Description
The new growth is thickly covered with long, soft, straight hairs, leaves persisting on lower branches. The underside is light green with hairs similar to those on the upper surface but usually not as closely appressed, and a rounded apex. Flowering has been observed throughout the year but mostly abundant in spring.

Taxonomy
Hibertia circinata was first formally described in 2018 by K.L. McDougall and G.T. Wright and the description was published in the journal Telopea.

Distribution and habitat
This species is only known from one location on the south coast of New South Wales on the summit of Mount Imlay National Park east of Eden. It grows in shrubby woodland dominated by Eucalyptus sieberi.

Conservation status
Hibbertia circinata is classified as "critically endangered" under the Biodiversity Conservation Act 2016. Its main threats are loss of habitat, a small, single population, few mature plants and threats of plant pathogens.

References

 

circinata
Flora of New South Wales